Roosevelt Independent School District is a small, innovative, public school district located 8 miles east of Lubbock, Texas (USA).

The district serves the unincorporated communities of Acuff and Roosevelt, along with the northern portions of the incorporated towns of Buffalo Springs and Ransom Canyon. A small portion of Lubbock lies within the district.

Roosevelt ISD has three schools -

Roosevelt High School (Grades 9-12), 
Roosevelt Junior High (Grades 6-8), and 
Roosevelt Elementary (Grades Pre-K - 5).

In 2009, the school district was rated "recognized" by the Texas Education Agency.

References

External links
Roosevelt ISD

School districts in Lubbock, Texas
School districts in Lubbock County, Texas